Hatbox Field  is a closed airfield located within city limits, two nautical miles (3.7 km) west of central Muskogee, a city in Muskogee County, Oklahoma, United States. It was opened sometime in the early 1920s and was closed in 2000.  It is the location of the Love-Hatbox Sports Complex, a large recreation center and waterpark.

The former airfield site includes 10 lighted baseball fields‚ eight lighted softball diamonds‚ two full-size football fields and a 30 acre‚ 19-field soccer area called the Georgia Pacific Soccer Complex.

In addition‚ a 3.1-mile (5 km) asphalt Centennial Trail walking/biking exercise pathway loops around the 120 acres‚ and a former airplane hangar houses three indoor batting cages. Three Rivers Area Model Plane Society (T.R.A.M.P.S.), a local model airplane club, hosts two annual events at Love-Hatbox that attract flying enthusiasts from around the country.

History
Hatbox Field was depicted on the 1929 Rand McNally "Standard Indexed Map with Air Trails of OK" as a public airport with a radio station.  The airfield was Muskogee's original municipal airport, and is a very historic airfield.  It is one of the airports that the Douglas aircraft of the Army's 1924 Around the World Flight stopped, and was a stop on the Army's mail route.

In 1929, the airfield was described as a municipal airport, operated by the Army Air Corps, and having a beacon light. Charles Lindbergh was on hand for the dedication.

The Spartan Aviation School opened at the field in 1940.  They used the two large arch-roofed hangars at Hatbox. Renamed Muskogee Army Airfield during World War II, Spartan provided primary flight training to cadets as an Army Air Forces contract flying school until 1944.   The USAAF 410th Bombardment Group trained at the airfield with Douglas A-20 Havocs in the fall of 1943 before being reassigned to the Ninth Air Force in England, where they flew Martin B-26 Marauders.

Following the end of its military use, Hatbox was reused as a purely civil airfield.  The operator was listed as the City of Muskogee.

The city of Muskogee decided to close the field to the public following a two-fatality crash in 1998. Limited aviation use was allowed until 2000, however, by a private firm that refurbished military-surplus Beechcraft U-21 Utes. Hatbox was closed completely in 2000, and the refurbishing company moved to nearby Muskogee Davis Field.

Facilities 
It had one runway designated 11/29 with an asphalt surface measuring 3,800 by 50 feet (1,158 x 15 m).

See also

 Oklahoma World War II Army Airfields
 List of United States Army airfields
 31st Flying Training Wing (World War II)

References

Other sources
 
 Manning, Thomas A. (2005), History of Air Education and Training Command, 1942–2002.  Office of History and Research, Headquarters, AETC, Randolph AFB, Texas 
 Maurer, Maurer (1983). Air Force Combat Units Of World War II. Maxwell AFB, Alabama: Office of Air Force History. .
 Shaw, Frederick J. (2004), Locating Air Force Base Sites, History’s Legacy, Air Force History and Museums Program, United States Air Force, Washington DC. 
  Abandoned & Little-Known Airfields: Eastern Oklahoma

External links 
 Encyclopedia of Oklahoma History and Culture - Hatbox Field
 Three Rivers Area Model Plane Society
 
 "Abandoned and Little-Known Airfields: Eastern Oklahoma" by Paul Freeman.  

1929 establishments in Oklahoma
Airfields of the United States Army Air Forces in Oklahoma
Defunct airports in Oklahoma
Airports in Oklahoma
Muskogee, Oklahoma
USAAF Contract Flying School Airfields
Buildings and structures in Muskogee County, Oklahoma
USAAF Central Flying Training Command
American Theater of World War II
2000 disestablishments in Oklahoma